Qibray is an urban-type settlement in Tashkent Region, Uzbekistan. It is the capital of Qibray District.

Presidential Residence
Since coming to power in December 2016, President Shavkat Mirziyoyev has used majority of Baytqorqon near Qibray to build his new residence, which would include a presidential highway and a presidential compound. As a result of the construction in the district, over 200 people have been displaced from their homes. There have been claims by interior designers for the project that the residence will be decorated with Argentinian blue marble slabs and Swarovski crystals.

References

Populated places in Tashkent Region
Urban-type settlements in Uzbekistan